Pinodytes newelli is a species of eyeless soil fungivore beetle in the family Leiodidae.  It is found in North America.

References

Further reading

External links

 

Leiodidae
Beetles described in 1957